Lion taming is the taming and training of lions, either for protection or for use in entertainment, such as the circus. The term often applies to the taming and display of lions and other big cats such as tigers, leopards, jaguars, black panthers, cheetahs, and cougars. People often use lion taming as a metaphor for any dangerous activity. Lion taming occurs in zoos around the world to enable the keepers to carry out medical procedures and feedings.

The Captive Animals Protection Society maintains that animal welfare cannot be guaranteed in circuses.

Notable lion tamers

In chronological order
 George Wombwell (1777–1850), founder of Wombwell's Traveling Menagerie, raised many animals himself, including the first lion bred in captivity in Britain.
 Isaac A. Van Amburgh (1811–1865), American animal trainer who developed the first trained wild animal act in modern times. He was known for acts of daring, such as placing his head inside the jaws of a wild cat, and became known as “The Lion King.”.
 Thomas Macarte (c. 1839–1872), killed during a performance in 1872 
 Martini Maccomo (c. 1839–1871), a lion tamer in Victorian Britain
 Carl Hagenbeck (1844–1913), a merchant of wild animals
 Suresh Biswas (1861–1905), Indian circus performer popular in Europe in the 1880s for taming wild animals
 Claire Heliot (1866–1953), German woman lion tamer born Klara Haumann (Huth)
 Tilly Bébé (1879–1932), Austrian lion and polar bear tamer
 Rose Flanders Bascom (1880–1915), first American female lion tamer
 Mabel Stark (1889–1968), one of the world's first women tiger tamers
 Clyde Beatty (1903–1965), one of the pioneers of using a chair in training big cats
 Irina Bugrimova (1911–2001), the first female lion tamer in Russia
 Gunther Gebel-Williams (1934–2001), a world-famous animal trainer for the Red Unit with Ringling Bros. and Barnum & Bailey Circus.
 Ángel Cristo (1943–2010), the most famous lion and tiger tamer in Spain, known for his numerous accidents under lion and tiger attacks. In 1982 he won the Medalla de Oro del Festival Internacional del Circo ('Golden Medal of the Circus International Festival').
 Martin Lacey, (born 1947), animal trainer, owner of the Great British Circus, trained most of the tigers used in the ESSO TV advertisements in the 1970s.
 Martin Lacey Jr., (born 1977), son of Martin, an animal trainer and performer with Circus Krone in Munich

References

Animal training
Circus skills
Animals in entertainment
Lions in popular culture
Lions and humans